The Centre for Muslim Jewish Relations (CMJR) was based at Wesley House in Cambridge, and was dedicated to the study and teaching of Muslim-Jewish Relations and the promotion of interfaith dialogue. In 2010 the CMJR and The Centre for Jewish-Christian Relations were renamed The Woolf Institute. CMJR was the first academic centre in Europe dedicated to fostering relations between Muslims and Jews through teaching, research and dialogue.

References

Islamic and Jewish interfaith dialogue
2006 establishments in England